Bielsko-Biała constituency is a Polish parliamentary constituency  in the Silesian Voivodeship.  It elects nine members of the Sejm.

The district has the number '27', and is named after the city of Bielsko-Biała.  It includes the counties of Bielsko, Cieszyn, Pszczyna and Żywiec and the city county of Bielsko-Biała.

List of members

Footnotes

Electoral districts of Poland
Bielsko-Biała
Silesian Voivodeship